Sirijangha  is a Gaupalika(Nepali: गाउँपालिका ; gaunpalika)(Formerly: village development committee) located in Taplejung District in the Mechi Zone of eastern Nepal. The local body was formed by merging eight VDCs Sinaam, Aambegudin, Sikaicha, Tellok, Pedanga, Mamankhe, Khewang, Yamphudin. Currently, it has a total of 8 wards. The population of the rural municipality is 15,806 according to the data collected on 2017 Nepalese local elections.

Population 
As per 2017, Sirijangha hosts a population of 15,806 across a total area of 481.09 km2.

See also
Taplejung District

References

Rural municipalities in Taplejung District
Rural municipalities in Koshi Province
Rural municipalities of Nepal established in 2017